The following lists events that happened during 1880 in South Africa.

Incumbents
 Governor of the Cape of Good Hope and High Commissioner for Southern Africa: John Gordon Sprigg.
 Lieutenant-governor of the Colony of Natal: Henry Ernest Gascoyne Bulwer.
 State President of the Orange Free State: Jan Brand.
 State President of the South African Republic: Triumviate of Paul Kruger, Marthinus Wessel Pretorius and Piet Joubert.
 Lieutenant-Governor of Griqualand West: James Rose Innes (until 15 October).
 Prime Minister of the Cape of Good Hope: John Gordon Sprigg.

Events

March
 20 – £50,000 worth of diamonds are reported stolen from Cape Town's post office.

April
 23 – Eugénie de Montijo, wife of Emperor Napoleon III of France, arrives in Durban to visit the grave of her son, Napoléon Eugène, Prince Imperial, who was killed in Zululand during the Anglo-Zulu War in 1879.

June
 15 – The Natal South Coast railway line from Durban is opened to traffic to Isipingo.

August
 British Governor Bartle Frere is recalled to London to face charges of misconduct.

September
 Cape Prime Minister Gordon Sprigg's attempt at disarming the Basotho ignites the Basuto Gun War.

October
 18 – Griqualand West is annexed to the Cape Colony.

December
 16 – Britain declares war against the South African Republic and starts the first Boer War.

Unknown date
 Britain forms the first Legislative Council in the Transvaal.
 The Afrikander Bond is established.
 The Transvaal declares itself the South African Republic again.
 The John N Gamewell, a small American brigantine, sinks off the west coast of the Cape Colony near Port Elizabeth.
 The Muizenberg Flyer, a faster suburban passenger train service, is introduced in Cape Town.

Births
 Cecilia Makiwane, first black woman to become a professional nurse in South Africa.
 23 December - John Hewitt, zoologist and archaeologist (d. 1961)

Deaths

Railways

Railway lines opened
 1 February – Natal – Rossburgh to Isipingo, .
 5 February – Cape Western – Fraserburg Road to Beaufort West, .
 2 March – Cape Midland – Middleton to Cookhouse, .
 5 May – Cape Eastern – Cathcart to Queenstown, .
 1 December – Natal – Botha's Hill to Pietermaritzburg, .

Locomotives
 The Cape Government Railways places the first nine of eighteen 4th Class  tank-and-tender locomotives in mainline service on its Midland System working out of Port Elizabeth and Eastern System working out of East London.
 The Natal Government Railways places a Class K  saddle-tank locomotive in service.

References

 
South Africa
Years in South Africa